Chris Clanton is an American actor best known for appearing in The Wire.

Career 
Clanton had a recurring role as Savino Bratton in seasons one and five of The Wire. He is credited as Christopher J. Clanton in the fifth season. He also had an uncredited role in The Corner as a street kid. Chris played the lead character Torn Pettigrew in the 2009 independent film TORN which was written and directed by Richard Johnson and produced by Corey Williams. In 2015, Clanton appeared in Tom Six's Dutch horror film The Human Centipede 3. In 2014, he also founded Hunted Foxx Entertainment a boutique production company with a focus on indie films.

Personal life 
In 2006, Clanton pled guilty to drug related charges and was sentenced to five years, four of which were suspended and three years of probation. In 2008, Clanton was stabbed in the chest and buttocks at the Overlea Event Center nightclub in Baltimore. Clanton was arrested again in 2019 after allegedly escaping police custody and violating a protective order.

In May 2021, Clanton was shot in the ear in Baltimore. He said he believes he was not the intended target.

Filmography

Film

Television

References

External links 
 

Living people
American male television actors
American male film actors
Male actors from Maryland
21st-century American male actors
Year of birth missing (living people)